Takako Hasegawa (born 1 January 1951) is a Japanese gymnast. She competed at the 1972 Summer Olympics where she finished thirty-fifth in the individual all around.

References

External links
 

1951 births
Living people
Japanese female artistic gymnasts
Olympic gymnasts of Japan
Gymnasts at the 1972 Summer Olympics
Place of birth missing (living people)
20th-century Japanese women